State Route 54 (SR 54) is a  state highway in the extreme southern part of the U.S. state of Alabama. The western terminus of the highway is at an intersection with U.S. Route 331 (US 331) at Florala just north of the Florida state line. The eastern terminus of the highway is at an intersection with SR 52 just west of Samson.

Route description

SR 54 is routed along a two-lane road as it traverses Covington and Geneva counties. From Florala, the highway travels in a generally east–west orientation. The highway assumes a northeasterly trajectory as it approaches the Covington–Geneva county line, and continues this orientation until it reaches its eastern terminus in western Geneva County.

Major intersections

See also

References

054
Transportation in Covington County, Alabama
Transportation in Geneva County, Alabama